Bruce S. Sherman (born May 1948) is an American businessman and co-founder of the wealth-management firm Private Capital Management and the chairman and majority owner of the Miami Marlins of Major League Baseball.

Early life
Sherman was raised in a middle-class neighborhood in Queens, New York, the son of Sylvia and Michael Sherman.  His mother was a school teacher in New York public schools. He has two brothers, Peter and Joel. He graduated with a B.A. from the University of Rhode Island and received a M.B.A. from Baruch College. After college, he worked for the accounting firm Arthur Young and then at the age of 29, was recruited by an executive search firm to be chief financial officer for a company owned by the Collier family.

Career
In 1985, he co-founded the wealth-management firm Private Capital Management (PCM) whose initial client was the Collier family. PCM expanded its customer base to include government agencies, colleges and universities. The firm grew to $4.4 billion in assets under management in 1999. In 1997, PCM sold International Dairy Queen (1997) to investor Warren Buffett for $585 million. In 2001, he sold PCM to Legg Mason for $1.4 billion. Sherman remained at the firm's helm and sold two additional companies to Buffett: Shaw Industries in 2001 for $2.1 billion and Garan (the maker of Garanimals) in 2002 for $270 million. Over the years, some of his successes include investments in Qualcomm Inc, Apple Computer, International Game Technology, Banknorth and Charter One Financial. By 2005, PCM had $31 billion in assets. By 2009, PCM's assets had reduced to $2.4 billion after several bad investments in newspaper companies (Knight Ridder, the New York Times Company, and Gannett Company) combined with a $478.6 million loss in their investment in Bear Stearns (which collapsed in 2008). Sherman retired in 2009 stating "I am very proud of my investment career over 23 years, especially the first 22 years." In August 2017, Sherman led a business group, including Michael Jordan and Derek Jeter, that made a $1.2 billion bid to purchase the Miami Marlins from Jeffrey Loria. Sherman is currently the team's principal owner and chairman.

Philanthropy
Sherman and his wife support various charities including the Naples Winter Wine Festival which benefits the Naples Children and Education Fund. In 2016, the couple founded the Sherman Prize which awards prizes to those who have made advances in the fight against inflammatory bowel diseases including ulcerative colitis and Crohn's disease (of which both his daughters are afflicted). The Shermans endowed the Bruce and Cynthia Sherman Professorship of Urology Research and Innovation at New York University. His wife is a founder of the Holocaust Museum of Southwest Florida in Naples.

Personal life
In 1999, he married Cynthia Kahn in Manhattan. He has two daughters, Lori Shaer and Randi Stanley, from a previous marriage to Marlene Bluestein.

References

1948 births
American business executives
Living people
Major League Baseball executives
Miami Marlins owners
Baruch College alumni
University of Rhode Island alumni
People from Queens, New York